Penonomé may refer to:

 Penonomé, Coclé
 Penonomé District